Chow Yam-nam (June 19, 1937 - August 17, 2013) was a Thai guru born in Pattaya to Chinese parents, better known publicly as Bak Lung-wong, literally the White dragon king.  His ancestry was from Chaozhou, Guangdong.  He was known for his legendary ability to bless people into becoming highly successful celebrities in Hong Kong.

Career

Early years
Earlier in his life Bak Lung-wong was said to have worked in the electronics industries, fixing bikes and was even a street hawker at one time.

Enlightenment
At the age of 13 he was said to have seen the spirit of a white dragon king next to the Universal Lord of the Way.   But it wasn't until he was 40+ years old when he became a trustee of the dragon king spirit.

Some time in the 1980s he received the white dragon enlightenment from the Universal lord and earned the Interactions Between Heaven and Mankind.  His life was changed forever afterwards.  Chow himself was then renamed to Bak Lung-wong, literally the white dragon king.  Since then he has been known as a "living saint".  At times he did learn about Xuanxue, but have admitted to have learned the art more from practicing and watching others.

Since that time quite a number of Hong Kong actors and actresses have become successful celebrities through him.

Blessings
Some of the people to have come in contact with him include Natalis Chan, Cecilia Wong Hang-sau, Andy Lau, Leon Lai, Jackie Chan, Carina Lau, Wong Jing, Tony Leung, Richie Ren, Shu Qi, Eric Tsang, Sammi Cheng, Miriam Yeung, Show Lo, Albert Yeung, Peter Lam and many more.  Even Edison Chen looked for help from Bak Lung-wong after the 2008 photo scandal.

It is believed the Canto-pop connection was established by Keeree Kanjanapas who introduced Chow to many influential people from Hong Kong.

A sample film that was a recent cinema success blessed by him was Infernal Affairs.

Other
In the 1990s Bak Lung-wong received a donation which allowed him to build the Bak Lung-wong temple.

Illness
In 2010 he was diagnosed with a serious case of influenza and his lung became increasingly ill.  He was hospitalized at a facility in Bangkok. He has since died from his illness.

External links
 White dragon king Temple

References

Chow Yam-nam
Chow Yam-nam
1937 births
2013 deaths
Saints